This is an index of articles about plagiarism. It includes different articles about incidents and examples of plagiarism, but does not include links to biographies of plagiarists or alleged plagiarists.

General concepts

Cryptomnesia
Geneivat da'at
Self-plagiarism

Types

Arts
18th-century American piracy of British literature
Forgery
Joke theft
Musical plagiarism
Sampling (music)
Legal issues surrounding music sampling
Swipe (comics)

Academic/scientific
Academic dishonesty
Contract cheating
Duplicate publication
Essay mill
Scientific misconduct

By location
Scientific plagiarism in Germany
Scientific plagiarism in India
Scientific plagiarism in the United States

Techniques
Rogeting

Works

Plagiarized or partially plagiarized works

Books
Dobson's Encyclopedia
Isis Unveiled

Music
1987 (What the Fuck Is Going On?)
300 Original Motion Picture Soundtrack
"Come Together"
H-Logic
"My Sweet Lord"

Works about plagiarism
An Uncommon Story

Events/incidents
2008 Canadian federal election speech plagiarism
Cooks Source infringement controversy
Dershowitz–Finkelstein affair
Ferenc Gyurcsány plagiarism controversy
Legal disputes over the Harry Potter series
Leibniz–Newton calculus controversy
Martin Luther King, Jr. authorship issues
Pál Schmitt academic misconduct controversy
Plagiarism from Wikipedia
Timbaland plagiarism controversy
Zsolt Semjén academic misconduct controversy

Anti-plagiarism
Dissernet
Plagiarism detection
VroniPlag Wiki

Software
Comparison of anti-plagiarism software
Copyscape
IThenticate
PlagScan
PlagTracker
TurnItIn
Unplag

Related concepts
Appropriation (art)
Authorship
Cover version
Derivative work
Fair use
Fraud
Imitation (art)
Intellectual property
Journalistic scandal
Originality
Parody
Pasticcio
Pastiche
Quotation
Replica
Tribute act

Wikipedia indexes